Frédéric Fontang was the defending champion, but lost in the quarterfinals to Sergi Bruguera.

Bruguera won the title by defeating his compatriot Emilio Sánchez 6–1, 6–3 in the final.

Seeds

Draws

Finals

Top half

Bottom half

References

External links
 Official results archive (ATP)
 Official results archive (ITF)

Campionati Internazionali di Sicilia
1992 ATP Tour
Camp